Harmony is an unincorporated community located along Arkansas Highway 103 in Johnson County, Arkansas, United States. It is the location of Harmony Presbyterian Church, which is a historic church listed on the National Register of Historic Places.

References

Unincorporated communities in Johnson County, Arkansas
Unincorporated communities in Arkansas